The 2013 KHL Expansion Draft was held on 17 June 2013 in order to fill the roster of the league's expansion team Admiral Vladivostok for the 2013-14 season.

Rules
Admiral Vladivostok was able to select players from any of the Russian-based teams in the KHL, except from Lokomotiv Yaroslavl. This exception was because Lokomotiv had been still recovering from the 2011 Lokomotiv Yaroslavl plane crash.

Five days before the draft, each team submitted five players to be available for selection in the expansion draft and the Vladivostok team was allowed to choose one player from each club. The players submitted for selection might have been either Russian or foreign. However, the Vladivostok roster had to contain no more than seven foreign players and no more than one foreign goaltender.

The players submitted to the draft had to meet the following criteria: 
 Players must be born in 1992 or earlier and have an existing contract with KHL clubs and a first team experience 
 Players who have received offers of a trial period or a contract from clubs
 Their contracts do not contain a clause prohibiting an exchange with another club
 Players whose contractual status is not In Conflict, Secured Rights or Reserved Player

The players names available for Admiral to choose from were not revealed to public due to ethical issues and league agreements with the various teams.

Draft picks
Below are all players drafted to Admiral in the extension draft:

References

2013–14 KHL season
Kontinental Hockey League expansion drafts
Admiral Vladivostok